Munangabum (? - 1846) was an influential clan head of the Liarga balug and Spiritual Leader or neyerneyemeet of the Dja Dja Wurrung people in central Victoria, Australia.

He was influential in shaping his peoples response to invasion and European settlement in the 1830s and 1840s. He was gaoled in 1840 for sheep-stealing which resulted in Dja Dja Wurrung people traveling to Melbourne to plead for his release. Woiwurrung and Djadja wurrung people feared that unless Munangabum was released, he would move Bunjil to release the Mindye causing a plague to black and white.

Munangabum was released from gaol in August 1840. On 7 February 1841 Munangabum was shot and wounded in the shoulder above the shoulder blade  by settlers while his companion Gondiurmin died at Far Creek Station, west of Maryborough. Three settlers were later apprehended and tried on 18 May 1841 for the murder of Gondiurmin but were acquitted for want of evidence, as aborigines could not give evidence in courts of law.

In 1841 he acted as an envoy for Assistant Protector of Aborigines Edward Stone Parker, and almost died from lack of water for three days on an expedition to the Mallee.

Munangabum was murdered in 1846 by a rival clan-head from the south.

References

1846 deaths
1846 murders in Australia
People murdered in Australia
Indigenous Australian people
History of Victoria (Australia)
Dja Dja Wurrung
Year of birth unknown